Leicester Devereux, 6th Viscount Hereford (1617 – 1 December 1676) was a British Peer.  He was the second son of Walter Devereux, 5th Viscount Hereford (1578–1658).

He married Elizabeth Withipoll, daughter and sole heiress of Sir William Withipoll who inherited Christchurch Mansion, Ipswich.  His second wife was Priscilla Catchpole.  His daughter Frances married William Tracy, 4th Viscount Tracy (1657–1712).  He was succeeded by his sons
Leicester and Edward.  His daughter Anne outlived her brothers and sister, becoming his heiress: she married Leicester Martin.

References
 Sir Egerton Brydges, Collins's Peerage of England VI (1812) p. 19
 Welsh Biography Online

1617 births
1676 deaths
Leicester 6
Leicester